John Banting (12 May 1902 – 30 January 1972) was an English artist and writer.

Born in Chelsea, London on 12 May 1902 and educated at Emanuel School, Banting was initially attracted to vorticism and associated with the Bloomsbury Group, before becoming interested in surrealism in Paris in the 1930s. Moving to Rye, Sussex in the 1950s he died in Hastings on 30 January 1972 aged 69.

He created many artworks such as:

Explosion, 1931,
Snake in The Grass, 1931,
Triplets, 1932,
One Man Band, 1934,

References

External links
John Banting on Artnet
Paintings by John Banting  (Bridgeman Art Library)
Tate Collection

20th-century English painters
English male painters
British surrealist artists
1902 births
1986 deaths
People educated at Emanuel School
Painters from London
Writers from London
20th-century English male writers
20th-century English male artists